"Generation Ex" is a song by Swedish alternative rock band Kent from their seventh studio album Tillbaka till samtiden (2007). It was released as the album's third single on 7 April 2008 as a digital download, and as a CD single on 9 April 2008. It contains a remix of "Berlin" by Simon Brenting, and the non-album bonus track "Det kanske kommer en förändring".	

The female singer on "Generation Ex", Caméla Leierth, also performs the backing vocals on the song "Vy från ett luftslott" from the same album.

Track listing

Charts

References

External links 
"Generation Ex" at Discogs

2008 singles
Kent (band) songs
Song recordings produced by Joshua (record producer)
Songs written by Joakim Berg
Songs written by Martin Sköld
2007 songs
Sony BMG singles